Tammie is a feminine given name, an abbreviation of Thomasina and Tamara. Notable people with the name include:

Tammie Green (born 1959), American golfer
Tammie Brown (born 1980), American drag performer and recording artist
Tammie Souza, American meteorologist
Tammie Wilson, American politician
Tammie Allen (born 1964), Native American potter
Tammie Leady (born 1969), American personal trainer and fitness and figure competitor
Tammie Teclemariam (born 1990), American freelance food and wine writer.

Feminine given names